is a Japanese professional wrestler, currently working for the Japanese professional wrestling promotion Pro Wrestling Noah.

Professional wrestling career

Independent circuit (1997-present)
Morohashi made his professional wrestling debut in International Wrestling Association of Japan, at IWA Japan FUTURE TRIAL TOUR ’97 on May 17, 1997, where he unsuccessfully challenged Hidetomo Egawa. He worked in intergender matches such as the one at Mio Shirai Produce Tonight Is The Night, an event produced by Mio Shirai and promoted by Oz Academy on March 2, 2014, where he teamed up with Gota Ihashi, falling short to Tsubasa Kuragaki and Aja Kong. Morohashi worked his only match for New Japan Pro-Wrestling at NJPW Lion's Road on November 8, 2004, where he teamed up with Kota Ibushi to defeat Hero! and Kudo.

Dramatic Dream Team (2002-2019)
Morohashi is known for his long term tenure with Dramatic Dream Team, promotion for which made his debut at DDT Non-Fix 5/23, on May 23, 2002, where he scored a defeat against Hero!. An early appearance he made for DDT was at Judgement 2008 from March 9, where he teamed up with Daisuke Sasaki to defeat Yukihiro Abe and Rion Mizuki by way of submission. Later that night, he teamed up with Koo and Toru Owashi to score a victory over Kota Ibushi, Daichi Kakimoto and Antonio Honda in six-man tag team match action. On March 27 at Judgement 2011, he entered first in a rumble match for a right to challenge for the KO-D Openweight Championship anytime, but came out unsuccessfully to the winner Shuji Ishikawa and others such as Kenny Omega, Shigehiro Irie and Minoru Fujita. At Ryōgoku Peter Pan 2013 on August 18, he participated in a Ironman Heavymetalweight Championship battle royal, match which he shared with Michael Nakazawa, Gorgeous Matsuno and Kyohei Mikami. At DDT New Year Lottery Special! 2016, Morohashi participated in a 10-man New Year Kakizome rumble match, where he faced other popular superstars such as Antonio Honda, Yuko Miyamoto and Kazusada Higuchi.

Pro Wrestling Noah (2017-present)
Morohashi made his debut in Pro Wrestling Noah on the seventh night of the NOAH Global Tag League 2017 on May 3, where he fell short to Tadasuke. In the same year, beginning with June 13, he teamed up with Phil Atlas and participated in the Global Junior Heavyweight Tag League, competing against teams such as Hi69 and Taiji Ishimori, and Mao and Shunma Katsumata, and finishing with eight points. One year later, he participated in the 2018 Global Junior Heavyweight Tag League, this time teaming up with Junta Miyawaki and competing against teams as Ikuto Hidaka and Takuya Sugawara, and Ricky Marvin and El Hijo del Pantera, finishing without scoring any points. The next year, in the 2019 Tag League, he teamed up again with Miyawaki, competing against teams such as Chris Ridgeway and Hitoshi Kumano, Hajime Ohara and Nosawa Rongai and finishing with a total of four points. Another notable appearance of Morohashi in Noah's events was at the 2018 Global Junior Heavyweight League, where he competed against Kotaro Suzuki, Daisuke Harada, Hitoshi Kumano, Tadasuke and Hajime Ohara, placing himself in the block B of the tournament and finishing with a total of two points. Morohashi participated in a no. 1 contendership tournament beginning at NOAH All Four Sides on June 19, 2020, for the GHC National Championship, falling short in a first-round match to Shuhei Taniguchi.

Championships and accomplishments
Best Body Japan Pro-Wrestling
BBW Tag Team Championship (1 time) – with Hiroshi Yamato
Dramatic Dream Team/DDT Pro-Wrestling
Ironman Heavymetalweight Championship (6 times)
King of Dark Championship (2 times)
KO-D Tag Team Championship (5 times) – with Shoichi Ichimiya (1), Tomohiko Hashimoto (1), Tanomusaku Toba (2) and Poco Takanashi (1)
KO-D Tag League (2003) – with Tomohiko Hashimoto 
Union Pro-Wrestling
World Aipoke Championship (1 time)

References 

1977 births
Living people
Japanese male professional wrestlers
20th-century professional wrestlers
21st-century professional wrestlers
Ironman Heavymetalweight Champions
King of Dark Champions
KO-D Tag Team Champions
World Aipoke Champions